Citizens' Alliance  (Symmachía Politón) was a political party that aimed for a unitary republic of Cyprus and rejected a federation of the Greek Cypriot and the Turkish parts. The party's leader was Giorgos Lillikas. It opposed the austerity program in Cyprus and was opposed to the privatisation of state assets.

On 24 June 2021, the party announced that it began discussions with the Movement for Social Democracy party, to merge Citizens' Alliance into the latter. In addition, party leader Giorgos Lillikas, announced his intention to retire from political life. The party officially ceased to exist on 2 December 2021 (as per the political party register) and the party website is no longer in operation.

References

External links
 

European Democratic Party
Political parties in Cyprus
Political parties established in 2013
Political parties disestablished in 2021